Category 4, the second-highest classification on the Saffir–Simpson Hurricane Scale, is used for tropical cyclones that have winds of . The division of the eastern and central Pacific basins occurs at 140° W; the eastern Pacific covers area east of 140° W, while the central Pacific extends between 140° W to 180° W. Both basins' division points are at 66° N as a northern point and the equator as the southern point. , 137 hurricanes have attained Category 4 status in the northeastern Pacific basins. This list does not include storms that also attained Category 5 status on the scale.

Numerous climatological factors influence the formation of hurricanes in the Pacific basins. The North Pacific High and Aleutian Low, usually present between January and April, cause strong wind shear and unfavorable conditions for the development of hurricanes. During its presence, El Niño results in increased numbers of powerful hurricanes through weaker wind shear, while La Niña reduces the number of such hurricanes through the opposite. Global warming may also influence the formation of tropical cyclones in the Pacific basin. During a thirty-year period with two sub-periods, the first between 1975 and 1989 and the second between 1990 and 2004, an increase of thirteen Category 4 or 5 storms was observed from the first sub-period.


Statistics and background 

When these hurricanes make landfall, impacts are usually severe but are not as destructive as Category 5 hurricanes that come ashore. The windspeed is measured at that height to prevent disruption from obstructions. Wind gusts in tropical cyclones are usually approximately 30% stronger than the one-minute maximum sustained winds.

The northeastern Pacific hurricane basins are divided into two parts – eastern and central. The eastern Pacific basin extends from all areas of the Pacific north of the equator east of 140° W, while the central Pacific basin includes areas north of the equator between 140° W and 180° W. Both basins extend to the Arctic Circle at 66° N.

When tropical cyclones cross from the Atlantic into the Pacific, the name of the previous storm is retained if the system continues to exhibit tropical characteristics; however, when hurricanes degenerate into a remnant low-pressure area, the system is designated with the next name on the rotating eastern Pacific hurricane naming list.

Since 1900, 137 Category 4 hurricanes have been recorded in the eastern and central Pacific basins. Of these, fourteen have attained Category 4 status on more than one occasion, by weakening to a status on the Saffir–Simpson Hurricane Scale lower than Category 4 and later restrengthening into a Category 4. Such storms are demarcated by the dates they first attained and the final time they lost the intensity. Only three storms, Hurricane Fico in 1978, Hurricane Norbert in 1984, and Hector in 2018, reached Category 4 status three times or more.

Between 1970 and 1975, advisories for systems in the eastern Pacific basins were initiated by the Eastern Pacific Hurricane Center (EPHC) as part of the National Weather Service (NWS) office in San Francisco, California. At that time, the advisories released were written in cooperation with the United States Navy Fleet Weather Center in Alameda and the Air Force Hurricane Liaison Officer at the McClellan Air Force Base. Following the move of the hurricane center to Redwood City in 1976, track files were created and altered by Arthur Pike and were later re-modified following the release of a study in 1980. The National Hurricane Center (NHC) extended its authority to the EPHC in 1988, and subsequently began maintaining the tracks.

Climatology 

A total of 137 Category 4 hurricanes have been recorded in the eastern and central Pacific basins since 1900. Only two Category 4 hurricanes have been recorded in May, in addition to 14 in June, 25 in July, 31 in August, 32 in September, 20 in October, and two in November. No Category 4 storms have developed during the off-season. It is theorized that global warming was responsible for an increase of 13 Category 4 and 5 storms that developed in the eastern Pacific, from 36 in the period of 1975–1989 to 49 in the period of 1990–2004. It was estimated that if sea-surface temperatures ascended by 2 to 2.5 degrees, the intensity of tropical cyclones would increase by 6–10% internationally. During years with the existence of an El Niño, sea-surface temperatures increase in the eastern Pacific, resulting in an increase in activity as vertical wind shear decreases in the Pacific; the opposite happens in the Atlantic basin during El Niño, when wind shear increases creating an unfavourable environment for tropical cyclone formation in the Atlantic. Contrary to El Niño, La Niña increases wind shear over the eastern Pacific and reduces it over the Atlantic.

The presence of a semi-permanent high-pressure area known as the North Pacific High in the eastern Pacific is a dominant factor against formation of tropical cyclones in the winter, as the Pacific High results in wind shear that causes environmental conditions for tropical cyclone formation to be unconducive. Its effects in the central Pacific basin are usually related to keeping cyclones away from the Hawaiian Islands. Due to westward trade winds, hurricanes in the Pacific nearly never head eastward, although several storms have defied the odds and headed eastward. A second factor preventing tropical cyclones from forming during the winter is the occupation of a semi-permanent low-pressure area designated the Aleutian Low between January and April. Its presence over western Canada and the northwestern United States contributes to the area's occurrences of precipitation in that duration. In addition, its effects in the central Pacific near 160° W causes tropical waves that form in the area to drift northward into the Gulf of Alaska and dissipate. Its retreat in late-April allows the warmth of the Pacific High to meander in, bringing its powerful clockwise wind circulation with it. The Intertropical Convergence Zone departs southward in mid-May permitting the formation of the earliest tropical waves, coinciding with the start of the eastern Pacific hurricane season on May 15.

Cooler waters near the Baja California peninsula are thought to prevent storms in the eastern Pacific from transitioning into an extratropical cyclone; as of 2009, only three storms listed in the database are known to have successfully completed an extratropical transition.

Category 4 Pacific hurricanes

Landfalls

Of the 137 Category 4 hurricanes that have formed in the eastern and central Pacific basins, 29 have made landfall. Of them, four made landfall at Category 4 intensity, three at Category 3, twelve at Categories 2 and 1, eight as tropical storms, and six as tropical depressions. Several of these storms weakened slightly after attaining Category 4 status as they approached land; this is usually a result of dry air, shallower water due to shelving, cooler waters, or interaction with land. Only in six years – 1976, 1983, 1992, 1997, 2014 and 2018 – more than one Category 4 hurricane made landfall, and only during one year – 2018 – did four Category 4 hurricanes made landfall.

See also 

List of Pacific hurricanes

Footnotes 
Notes

General

Specific

List
Category 4
Pacific 4